Gajec  may refer to:

 Gajec, Poland, a village near Rzepin
 Gajec, Croatia, a village near Zagreb